Edward Romilly (19 April 1804, London – 12 October 1870, Porthkerry, Glamorgan) was an English amateur cricketer who played first-class cricket from 1825 to 1831, and a Member of Parliament from 1832 to 1835. He was a Cambridge Apostle.

Life
Edward Romilly was the third son of Sir Samuel Romilly. He was educated at King Edward VI School in Bury St Edmunds and entered Christ's College, Cambridge in 1822. In 1826, he migrated to Trinity Hall, and graduated LL.B. in 1828.

As a cricketer Romilly was mainly associated with Cambridge University Cricket Club and Marylebone Cricket Club (MCC), of which he was a member.  He made 9 known appearances in first-class matches including 1 for the Gentlemen in 1827.

Standing as a Whig, he was elected at the 1832 general election as one of the two Members of Parliament (MP) for Ludlow, but was defeated at the 1835 general election.

Romilly was a member of the Board of Audit from 1837 to 1866, and its chairman from 1855 to 1865.

References

Bibliography
 Arthur Haygarth, Scores & Biographies, Volume 1-2 (1744–1840), Lillywhite, 1862

External links 
 
 

1804 births
1870 deaths
English cricketers
English cricketers of 1787 to 1825
English cricketers of 1826 to 1863
Cambridge University cricketers
Marylebone Cricket Club cricketers
Whig (British political party) MPs for English constituencies
UK MPs 1832–1835
British sportsperson-politicians
Members of the Parliament of the United Kingdom for constituencies in Shropshire
Gentlemen cricketers
Alumni of Christ's College, Cambridge
Alumni of Trinity Hall, Cambridge
People educated at King Edward VI School, Bury St Edmunds
A to K v L to Z cricketers
Committee members of the Society for the Diffusion of Useful Knowledge